This is a complete list of Japanese explosives used during the Second World War. It is sorted according to application.

References
 

Explosives
World War II explosives